God Knows is a tragicomedic novel written by Joseph Heller and published in 1984.

Plot

It is narrated by the Biblical King David of Israel, and purports to be his deathbed memoirs; however, this David does not recount his life in a straightforward fashion, and the storyline is often hilariously fractured. Indeed, it is possible to read the book as Heller's meditation upon his own mortality, and an exploration of the Jewish view of family, life, death, etc.

All of the major touchstones of King David's life are in place: his childhood herding sheep, the prophet Samuel, Goliath, King Saul, Jonathan (and homosexual innuendoes), Bathsheba and Uriah, the Psalms, the treachery of Absalom, Solomon, etc.

At some points, David betrays knowledge of the future (he mentions Michelangelo's David, saying it is ironic that a King of the Jews should stand there uncircumcised), and even of heaven (Moses sits on a rock in the afterworld, working on his stutter) – we are left to guess whether or not this stems from his special relationship with God, as no answers are forthcoming.

Though not nearly as famous as Heller's Catch-22, God Knows explores many of the same themes.

1984 American novels
Novels by Joseph Heller
Alfred A. Knopf books
Novels based on the Bible
Cultural depictions of David
Absalom